Joshi Helgesson (born 7 June 1993) is a Swedish retired figure skater. She is the 2014 Bavarian Open champion, 2011 Nebelhorn Trophy bronze medalist, and three-time Swedish national champion.

She and her sister Viktoria are the only siblings to finish together in the top 5 of a major championship as single skaters, a feat achieved during the 2015 European Championships.

Personal life 
Joshi Helgesson was born in Tibro, Sweden. Her elder sister, Viktoria, is also a former competitive skater, and their mother, Christina, is their coach. She also has an older brother named Lukas and a father named Lennart.

Career

Early career 
Helgesson placed 4th at the 2009 World Junior Championships in Sofia, Bulgaria. Her Grand Prix debut came at the start of the following season; she placed 9th at the 2009 Skate America and 11th at the 2009 Skate Canada International.

In April 2011, Helgesson made her senior ISU Championship debut at the World Championships in Moscow. After advancing past the preliminary round, she placed 16th in the short program and qualified for the final segment. Her 13th place in the free skate lifted her to 15th overall. In January 2012, Helgesson finished 10th in Sheffield, England at her first European Championships.

2012–13 season: Top ten at Europeans 
In the early part of the 2012–13 season, Helgesson sustained a stress fracture of the fibula in her take-off leg but returned to the ice two weeks before the 2012 Cup of China, where she finished 7th. She placed 8th at her second GP event, the 2012 Trophée Éric Bompard, and 9th at the 2012 NRW Trophy.

She won the 2013 Swedish national title ahead of her sister and went on to place 8th at the 2013 European Championships in Zagreb, Croatia. After taking silver at the Nordic Championships, she closed her season with gold medals at the Hellmut Seibt Memorial and Coupe du Printemps.

2013–14 season: Worlds Final and Nordic Champion 

Helgesson started her season by winning the silver medal at the Denkova-Staviski Cup. After taking silver at the Swedish Championships, she placed 9th at the 2014 European Championships in Budapest, Hungary.

Helgesson won gold at the Bavarian Open and at the Nordic Championships. In March 2014, she travelled to Saitama, Japan to compete at her second World Championships; she placed 15th in the short, 12th in the free, and 14th overall.

2014–15 season: 4th at Europeans 
Helgesson started her season on the ISU Challenger Series (CS), finishing 7th at the Lombardia Trophy and winning the silver medal at the Ondrej Nepela Trophy. She withdrew from both of her GP assignments, the 2014 Skate America and 2014 Rostelecom Cup, due to an injury.

After winning silver at the Swedish Championships, Helgesson achieved a career-best 4th-place finish at the European Championships in Stockholm, Sweden. Closing her season, she finished 14th at the 2015 World Championships in Shanghai, China.

2015–16 season 
After starting her season with silver at the Lombardia Trophy, Helgesson competed at a pair of CS events, placing 7th at the 2015 Ondrej Nepela Trophy and then taking the bronze medal at the 2015 Finlandia Trophy. She finished 9th at both of her GP assignments, the 2015 Skate Canada International and 2015 Rostelecom Cup. At the 2016 Europeans Helgesson placed 6th in the short program, but 11th in the free skate and 9th overall. She won the 2016 Nordics Open ahead of Viveca Lindfors. At the 2016 Worlds she did two major mistakes in her short program, placed 30th and did not qualify to the free skate.

2016–17 season 
Following the 2016–17 season Helgesson announced that she would move from Tibro to Toronto, Ontario, Canada to train with Brian Orser. She started her season by placing 7th at 2016 CS Autumn Classic and 9th at 2016 CS Finlandia Trophy.

2017–18 season 
Helgesson trained for the season to participate in the 2018 Winter Olympics. She competed at the 2017 CS Lombardia Trophy, but her level of skating did not improve as she planned. On 7 November 2017, she announced her retirement from competition.

Programs

Competitive highlights 
GP: Grand Prix; CS: Challenger Series; JGP: Junior Grand Prix

2009–10 to present

2004–05 to 2008–09

References

External links

 Joshi Helgesson official website
 

1993 births
Living people
People from Tibro Municipality
Swedish female single skaters
Sportspeople from Västra Götaland County
21st-century Swedish women